Dhanush is an Indian actor, producer and screenwriter known for his work in Tamil cinema. He has also appeared in some Hindi and English films. He made his acting debut in 2002 with the coming of age drama, Thulluvadho Ilamai, directed by his father Kasthuri Raja. His role as a mentally-disturbed man in Kaadhal Kondein (2003)directed by his brother Selvaraghavanwon him critical acclaim. The following year, he starred in Subramaniam Siva's Thiruda Thirudi, a commercial success. This was followed by a series of commercial failuresPudhukottaiyilirundhu Saravanan (2004), Sullan (2004) and Dreams (2004). He had two releases in 2005Devathaiyai Kanden and Adhu Oru Kana Kaalam.

In 2006, Dhanush starred in the gangster film Pudhupettai, which was critically acclaimed and moderately successful at the box-office. He next collaborated with debutant director Vetrimaaran in Polladhavan (2007). It was critically acclaimed and commercially successful. His subsequent releasesYaaradi Nee Mohini (2008) and Padikkadavanwere box-office successes. He collaborated with Vetrimaaran for the second time in Aadukalam (2011). His role as a rooster fight jockey in the film won him that year's National Film Award for Best Actor and the Best Tamil Actor Award at the 60th Filmfare Awards South. In 2012, he received international attention with the song "Why This Kolaveri Di", which was recorded for Aishwarya R. Dhanush's directorial debut 3. His role as a man who is suffering from bipolar disorder in the film won him his second Filmfare Award.

Dhanush made his Bollywood debut with Aanand L. Rai's Raanjhanaa (2013). His performance as an obsessive one-sided lover in the film won him the Best Male Debut Award and earned a Best Actor nomination at the 59th Filmfare Awards. The same year he was seen in the survival film Maryan, which won him Best Actor Award (Critics) at the 61st Filmfare Awards South. In 2014, he produced and starred in cinematographer R. Velraj's directorial debut, Velaiilla Pattadhari, which was critically acclaimed as well as a box-office success. His performance as an unemployed graduate won a third Filmfare Award in the Best Tamil Actor category.

In 2015, Dhanush co-starred with Amitabh Bachchan in R. Balki's Shamitabh, where he played a mute superstar. The following year Dhanush played three roles in K. V. Anand's romantic thriller Anegan (2015) and a gangster in Balaji Mohan's Maari (2015), both becoming moderately success at the box office. He collaborated with Velraj's Thanga Magan (2015), which did not perform well at the box office when compared to his previous film. Dhanush had two releases in 2016Prabhu Solomon's Thodari, a critical and commercial failure; and the political thriller Kodi, where he played dual roles. The latter earned him a Best Tamil Actor nomination at the 64th Filmfare Awards South. The following year, he made his directorial debut with Pa Paandi. In 2018, Dhanush made his first international film appearance with the English-language French film The Extraordinary Journey of the Fakir. His performance in Asuran (2019) won him his second National Film Award for Best Actor.

Filmography

As actor

As producer

See also 
 Wunderbar Films
 List of awards and nominations received by Dhanush

Notes

References

External links 
 
 Dhanush on Bollywood Hungama

Indian filmographies
Male actor filmographies